Margaretville Railroad Station at Margaretville, New York, MP 35.9, was located on the southern side of the Delaware River at the foot of Mt. Pakatakan, with the village on the northern side. The headquarters for the Delaware and Northern Railroad was located on the second floor of the Galli-Curci building, on Main Street in the village. Along with the station at Margaretville, there was a water tower, a paint shop, a shop that rebuilt or repaired locomotives, and a freight house, where merchants would drop off goods that would later be picked up by incoming trains.

This station was abandoned when the Delaware and Northern went out of business in 1942.  In later years, the station was operated as a store by Grange League Federation, a farmer's co-op. In the 1970s, the station was razed when New York State Route 28 was relocated to run through the site. The site of the former freight yard is now a parking lot full of mobile homes, all of which are for sale.

Railway stations in the Catskill Mountains
Railway stations closed in 1942
Railway stations in Delaware County, New York